MDHC may stand for:

 McKay-Dee Hospital Center (Ogden, Utah)
 Mersey Docks and Harbour Company (Liverpool, UK)